Rudani (also Romanized as Rūdāni, Rūdney, Rowdenī, and Rūdaney; also known as Radney and Rūney) is a village in Aghili-ye Jonubi Rural District, Aghili District, Gotvand County, Khuzestan Province, Iran. At the 2006 census, its population was 69, consisting of 16 families.

References 

Populated places in Gotvand County